The 1996 United States presidential election in Utah took place on November 7, 1996, as part of the 1996 United States presidential election. Voters chose five representatives, or electors to the Electoral College, who voted for president and vice president.

Utah was won by Republican nominee Bob Dole by a 21.07 percent margin of victory. This was Dole’s highest margin of victory for any state in the country. Dole also obtained 54.37 percent of the vote in Utah, higher than any other state. , this is the last election in which Tooele County and Carbon County voted for a Democratic presidential candidate.

Results

Results by county

Electors
Technically the voters of Utah cast their ballots for electors: representatives to the Electoral College. Utah is allocated five electors because it has three congressional districts and two senators. All candidates who appear on the ballot or qualify to receive write-in votes must submit a list of five electors, who pledge to vote for their candidate and his or her running mate. Whoever wins the majority of votes in the state is awarded all five electoral votes. Their chosen electors then vote for president and vice president. Although electors are pledged to their candidate and running mate, they are not obligated to vote for them. An elector who votes for someone other than his or her candidate is known as a faithless elector.

The electors of each state and the District of Columbia met in December 1996 to cast their votes for president and vice president. The Electoral College itself never meets as one body. Instead the electors from each state and the District of Columbia met in their respective capitols. 

All electors from Utah were pledged to and voted for Bob Dole and Jack Kemp.

See also
 United States presidential elections in Utah
 Presidency of Bill Clinton

References

Utah
1996
1996 Utah elections